The Sadu is a right tributary of the river Cibin in Romania. It discharges into the Cibin in Tălmaciu. The Negovanu and Sadu II dams are located on the Sadu.

Tributaries

The following rivers are tributaries to the river Sadu (from source to mouth):

Left: Cânaia, Șerbănei, Rozdești, Dușa, Beșineu, Bătrâna, Valea Groșilor, Valea Cândii, Sașa, Valea Vârjoghii, Valea Bonții, Ciupari, Valea Hotarelor, Cârligele, Pârâul Rece, Valea Casei
Right: Conțu, Negovanu, Valea Pitarului, Valea Doamnei, Sădurel, Valea lui Ivan, Drăgăneasa, Valea lui Roman, Puntea, Mancu, Prejba, Obrești, Lacul, Valea Plaiului, Juvertul, Mesteacănu, Varul, Priboiu

References

Rivers of Romania
Rivers of Sibiu County